The 1960 Oklahoma Sooners football team represented the University of Oklahoma during the 1960 NCAA University Division football season. They played their home games at Oklahoma Memorial Stadium and competed as members of the Big Eight Conference. They were coached by head coach Bud Wilkinson.

Schedule

Rankings

Postseason

NFL draft
The following players were drafted into the National Football League following the season.

References

Oklahoma
Oklahoma Sooners football seasons
Oklahoma Sooners football